Somenath Shyam Ichini is an Indian politician member of All India Trinamool Congress.  He is an MLA, elected from the Jagatdal constituency in the 2021 West Bengal Legislative Assembly election.

References 

Trinamool Congress politicians from West Bengal
Living people
People from North 24 Parganas district
West Bengal MLAs 2021–2026
Year of birth missing (living people)